The women's handball tournament at the 1996 Summer Olympics was contested by eight teams divided in two groups, with the top two proceeding to the semifinals and the bottom two proceeding to placement matches.

Qualification

Squads

Preliminary round

Group A

Group B

Playoffs

Bracket

Semifinals

Seventh place game

Fifth place game

Bronze medal game

Gold medal game

Rankings and statistics

References

External links
Handball & Olympic Games 1936-2000, International Handball Federation, pp. 38–39
Barcelona 1996: Handball at marcolympics.org

Handball at the 1996 Summer Olympics
Women's handball in the United States
Olym
1996 in American women's sports
Women's events at the 1996 Summer Olympics